Justyna Franieczek (born 6 April 1989 in Wrocław ) - Polish paralympic athlete.  In 2021, she competed at the 2020 Summer Paralympics,  in 400m T20 finishing fifth. Finalist of the World Championships in Dubai in 2019, bronze medalist of the European Championships, Polish champion, member of the national team. She comes in the T20 category. In 2021, she won the title of world champion in the 400 m race and in the relay race. Finalist of the Tokyo Paralympic Games. On October 13, 2021, the Governor of Wielkopolska, Michał Zieliński, appointed Justyna Franieczek to the Sports Council of the Wielkopolska Province Governor.

Personal life 
As a junior, she won medals of the Polish championship together with non-disabled people. Later, however, she was diagnosed with cancer, which caused her to quit the sport. She returned after a successful fight with the disease. After some time, she had a serious car accident, suffering a 30% injury, and a pregnancy loss as a result. Her recovery and sport took eight years.

Career 
In 2019, she performed at the World Championships in Dubai, finishing seventh in the 400 meter T20 category.In 2020, she won a silver medal in the Polish Disabled Swimming Championships, representing the Start Skrzatusz club. In 2021, she won a bronze medal in the Polish Cross-country Ski Championship for Disabled People and two gold medals at the 49th Polish Paralympic Athletics Championships and XXVIII Polish Athletics Championships, whereas in the European Championship she won a bronze medal. In the final of the Tokyo Paralympics, she was fifth.

International competitions

Bibliography

References 

1989 births
Living people
Sportspeople from Wrocław
Paralympic athletes of Poland
Polish female sprinters
Athletes (track and field) at the 2020 Summer Paralympics
Medalists at the World Para Athletics European Championships